The Cabbage Patch riots were a series of violent customer outbursts at several retail stores in the United States in the fall and winter of 1983.  That year, Cabbage Patch Kids had been released for sale in the United States, causing a tremendous demand for the product.  Most stores at the time typically only stocked between two to five hundred of the product, yet with thousands of customers surging the store attempting to obtain one of the dolls, many fought with other customers in order to obtain one of the products.

The holiday season of 1983 saw several violent occurrences in such major retail stores as Sears, J. C. Penney, Wards and Macy's.  In smaller retail sales, such as Kmart and the now-defunct Zayre, retailers attempted to control crowds by handing out "purchase tickets" to the first several hundred customers, leaving hundreds, if not thousands, empty-handed after standing in line for several hours.

Reports of violence included hitting, shoving, trampling as well as some customers attacking others with weapons such as baseball bats in order to obtain a Cabbage Patch Doll. By 1984, with more supply of the dolls and demand dropping, violence declined. 

The Cabbage Patch riots foreshadowed subsequent holiday toy crazes, such as for the Tickle Me Elmo in 1996 and Hatchimals in 2016. The riots also inspired the plot of the holiday film Jingle All the Way.

References

1983 riots
Riots and civil disorder in the United States
1983 in the United States
Toy controversies
1980s fads and trends